Albert Joel "A. J." Loveland (May 9, 1893 – August 7, 1961), served as Under-Secretary of Agriculture, now known as United States Deputy Secretary of Agriculture, under President Harry S. Truman.  Loveland was appointed to the post by Truman in 1948 and served until March 27, 1950, to run for congress.  A member of the Democratic Party, Loveland ran unsuccessfully against Republican Bourke Blakemore Hickenlooper for the U.S. Senate election in 1950.

Loveland's first public office was as a member of the Janesville School Board.  He was a graduate of Janesville High School and the College of Commerce in Waterloo, Iowa.  He was one of the founding members of the Agricultural Adjustment Administration during the Great Depression, later serving chairman of that organization in Iowa.  From 1941 until 1945, Loveland was the chairman of the Iowa State War Board for Agriculture.

Electoral history

Personal life
Born on the family farm just east of Janesville, Iowa, Loveland was the oldest of seven children born to Wilbert B. and Cora Loveland, and the grandson of Dr. Joel Loveland. Albert J. Loveland was a third-generation farmer, carrying on his father's herd of registered Holstein cattle.

Married on July 15, 1914, to Vivian Slaughter, Albert J. Loveland was the father of four children. At the time of his death, he still resided on the family farm where he was born.  Loveland is buried at Oakland Cemetery near Janesville.

References

External links
Ourcampaigns.com Profile

United States Department of Agriculture officials
Iowa Democrats
School board members in Iowa
1893 births
1961 deaths
People from Janesville, Iowa
20th-century American politicians